Mini flyweight, also known as strawweight, minimumweight or super atomweight, is a weight class in combat sports.

Boxing
This is a relatively new weight category for professionals, first inaugurated by the major boxing sanctioning bodies between 1987 and 1990.

History
The minimumweight division was originally introduced in 1968 for the Summer Olympic Games under the name light flyweight. However the division was not recognized by any of the four most widely regarded sanctioning bodies until the International Boxing Federation (IBF) in June 1987 when Kyung-Yun Lee knocked out Masaharu Kawakami to become the inaugural champion.

The division was then later recognized by the World Boxing Council (WBC) in October 1987, the World Boxing Association (WBA) in January 1988, and the World Boxing Organization (WBO) in August 1989, while Ring magazine did not begin ranking minimumweights until 1997 under the name strawweights and has yet to name a champion in their rankings.

Historically the weight class has been dominated by Latin Americans and Asians with only a limited amount of success coming from other nationalities.

Late 1980s (1987–1989)

In the early years of the division, fighters such as Napa Kiatwanchai found success defending the WBC belt. Including early wins over a young up-and-coming Hiroki Ioka who later found success at light flyweight, flyweight, and super flyweight.

Other notable champions of this period included Nico Thomas, Jum-Hwan Choi and Leo Gamez.

Other successful fighters of this period include:

 Ricardo López - defended his WBC title against record-breaking 21 opponents.
 Ratanapol Sor Vorapin - IBF title-holder for most of the decade.
 Chana Porpaoin - held WBA title until losing the title to Rosendo Álvarez, who then held it until 1998 for failing to make weight for his unification rematch with Ricardo Lopez (he lost by split decision).

The division also saw its first champions not from Latin America or Asia when Scotland's Paul Weir won the vacant WBO title over Fernando Martinez in May 1993. This was followed by South Africa's Zolani Petelo who won the IBF title in December 1997.

Other notable fighters of this period included, Hi-Yong Choi, Hideyuki Ohashi, Alex Sánchez, Wandee Chor Chareon, Rocky Lin, Ala Villamor, Kermin Guardia, Noel Arambulet, Songkram Porpaoin, and Osvaldo Guerrero.

2000s

In the early part of the decade, José Antonio Aguirre and Iván Calderón were the most decorated champions.

Muhammad Rachman, Yutaka Niida, and Eagle Kyowa became champions. José Antonio Aguirre began to decline but Iván Calderón continued to defend his WBO title until August 2007 when he moved up to light flyweight.

In the later part of the decade, Oleydong Sithsamerchai, Donnie Nietes, Raúl García, and Román González were champions.

2010s

In the early part of the decade many of the fighters from the end of the 2000s continued to find success. However new faces have included Denver Cuello and Kazuto Ioka (nephew of 1980s champion Hiroki Ioka). In the latter part of the decade Thai boxers returned to dominance with Thammanoon Niyomtrong and Chayaphon Moonsri winning titles and staying undefeated.

Professional boxing

Current world champions

Current The Ring world rankings

Keys:
 Current The Ring world champion

Amateur boxing
Since 1968, the Summer Olympic Games has featured the 48 kilogram division under the name light flyweight .

Olympic champions
1968 – 
1972 – 
1976 – 
1980 – 
1984 – 
1988 – 
1992 – 
1996 – 
2000 – 
2004 – 
2008 – 
2012 –

European Champions
1969 –  György Gedó (HUN)
1971 –  György Gedó (HUN)
1973 –  Vladislav Sasypko (URS)
1975 –  Aleksandr Tkachenko (URS)
1977 –  Henryk Średnicki (POL)
1979 –  Shamil Sabirov (URS)
1981 –  Ismail Mustafov (BUL)
1983 –  Ismail Mustafov (BUL)
1985 –  René Breitbarth (GDR)
1987 –  Nszan Munczian (URS)
1989 –  Ivailo Marinov (BUL)
1991 –  Ivailo Marinov (BUL)
1993 –  Daniel Petrov (BUL)
1996 –  Daniel Petrov (BUL)
1998 –  Sergey Kazakov (RUS)
2000 –  Valeriy Sydorenko (UKR)
2002 –  Sergey Kazakov (RUS)
2004 –  Sergey Kazakov (RUS)
2006 –  David Ayrapetyan (RUS)

Pan American Champions
1971 –  Rafael Carbonell (CUB)
1975 –  Jorge Hernández (CUB)
1979 –  Hector Ramírez (CUB)
1983 –  Rafael Ramos (PUR)
1987 –  Luis Román Rolón (PUR)
1991 –  Rogelio Marcelo (CUB)
1995 –  Edgar Velázquez (VEN)
1999 –  Maikro Romero (CUB)
2003 –  Yan Bartelemí Varela (CUB)

Notable minimumweights
 Iván Calderon
 Ricardo López
 Rosendo Álvarez
Alex Sánchez
 Donnie Nietes
 Eagle Kyowa
 Chana Porpaoin
 Ratanapol Sor Vorapin
 Yutaka Niida
Muhammad Rachman
Román González

Kickboxing
In kickboxing, the International Kickboxing Federation (IKF) Strawweight division (professional and amateur) is below 108.1 lbs. or 49.09 kg.

Mixed martial arts

In MMA, strawweight is considered 115lbs (52kg) and below and is typically contested by women. It is never referred to as "minimumweight" in MMA.

Other sports
Other sports to include a minimumweight division include the following,
 Muay Thai, both Lumpinee Boxing Stadium and Rajadamnern Stadium feature a 105-pound weight categories recognized as mini flyweight.
 Judo, features a 105-pound weight category for female competitions.
 Various styles of wrestling feature a 105-pound weight category. Including a 48 kilogram women's division in the Summer Olympic Games.
 Taekwondo, commonly features competitions at or around 105 pounds. Including a 49 kilogram women's division in the Summer Olympic Games recognized as flyweight.

See also

Pinweight

References

 
Boxing weight classes
Kickboxing weight classes
Taekwondo weight classes